The 2018 AFL season was the 93rd season in the Australian Football League (AFL) contested by the North Melbourne Football Club.

North Melbourne were widely predicted for a second-straight bottom six finish, including several predictions which would see them winning the wooden spoon. Strong performances by Shaun Higgins and Ben Brown meant the Kangaroos finished comfortably mid-table, finishing 9th with 48 points and a percentage of 108.9%.

List changes

Retirements and delistings

Trades

Free Agency

Gain

National draft

Rookie draft

Category B rookie selections

Season summary

Pre-season

AFLX

JLT Community Series

Home and away season

Ladder

VFL

The 2018 VFL season was the 1st season in the Victorian Football League contested by the North Melbourne Football Club.

Playing Squad

Ladder

References

North Melbourne